The Community of Jesus' Compassion (CJC) is an Anglican religious order founded in 1993, and located near Pietermaritzburg, South Africa in the Diocese of Natal of the Anglican Church of Southern Africa.  The primary work of the sisters in concerned with evangelism and children's ministry.

References
Anglican Religious Communities Yearbook:  2004-2005.  Norwich:  Canterbury Press, 2003.

Christian organizations established in 1993

Anglican religious orders established in the 20th century